Sediminibacterium roseum is a Gram-negative, aerobic and motile bacterium from the genus of Sediminibacterium which has been isolated from sewage sediments from Busan in Korea.

References

Chitinophagia
Bacteria described in 2017